The Serpent's Egg is a 1977 American-West German drama film written and directed by Ingmar Bergman and starring David Carradine and Liv Ullmann. The story is set in 1920s Berlin and features English and German dialogue. It was Bergman's only Hollywood film. The title is taken from a line spoken by Brutus in Shakespeare's Julius Caesar: "And therefore think him as a serpent's egg / Which hatch'd, would as his kind grow mischievous; / And kill him in the shell". Even though the film was a critical and commercial failure upon its initial release, Bergman was reported to be happy with the film.

Plot 

The scene is Berlin in late 1923. Abel Rosenberg, an American-born Jew, is an unemployed alcoholic and former trapeze artist who uses alcohol to help him deal with the horrific nature and uncertainties of life in post-war Germany, poverty and inflation having crippled the German economy at the time. He returns home one night to discover that his brother Max has committed suicide. Abel meets up with his old boss, who gives him some money in an attempt to persuade him back to his now-successful circus. Abel realizes that he will not be as good as he was with his brother and declines, but his boss allows him to keep the money anyway. The Jewish community is being portrayed in the media as a drain on society; despite being a Jew himself, Abel has little sympathy for people, Jewish or otherwise, who get into trouble for "acting stupid." He goes to see his brother's wife Manuela to break the news of Max's death to her. She asks what triggered Max's suicide, but Abel is unable to provide a solid answer. The only sentence in Max's suicide note Abel can make out reads: "There's poisoning going on."

Attempting to drown his sorrow, Abel goes on a drinking binge that lingers into the early hours, and he spends the night at Manuela's house. The next morning, the two discuss possible new career paths for Abel. After Manuela leaves for work, Abel steals from her in order to buy alcohol. He is later taken by the police to the mortuary to identify a series of bodies, the first of which is that of Gretha Hofer, his brother's former fiancée who drowned. He is shown the body of another man who was murdered by a lethal injection; he does not know the man but comments that the man strongly resembles his deceased father. Next he is shown the body of an old female suicide victim whom Abel identifies as a woman who used to deliver papers to his village. Finally he is shown the body of a young boy who was hit by a truck, but he does not recognize the boy. Abel is told that all of the mysterious deaths happened within the vicinity of his home. He is told that he will have to remain in police custody until they are convinced of his innocence. Convinced that he is being set up because he is a Jew, he tries to escape the police station, but is quickly recaptured.

Manuela visits Abel in the hospital, where she informs him that all her money is gone, but Abel does not confess. Abel is released for lack of evidence and returns home with Manuela. However, on returning home Manuela is told by her landlady that Abel must leave because he and Manuela are not married, so Manuela decides to leave with Abel. As they prepare to leave, Manuela confesses to Abel that she actually works as a prostitute and concocted her office job out of shame.

In November, many fear an armed confrontation between extremist parties. Abel and Manuela live in an apartment on the outskirts of town. Manuela leaves for work one morning but Abel secretly follows her, discovering that she has actually been going to church. She confides in the priest that she feels responsible for her husband's death and is struggling to maintain her new life with Abel, as the two have become consumed by fear.

That evening, Abel discovers that Manuela had acquired their new apartment by providing sexual favors to the owner of the brothel where she works. He is initially disgusted and leaves and find his own place, but he soon returns and shares a passionate kiss with Manuela. One night while Abel and Manuela are enjoying a drink in the brothel and enjoying the cabaret, the brothel is overrun by soldiers who beat the owner to death before burning the building.

Abel secures a job as a file clerk in a hospital while Manuela gains employment at the hospital clinic. They are given an apartment surrounded by many derelict or empty buildings. One night, Abel is alerted to files containing detailed reports of past graphic and inhumane experiments conducted on patients at the hospital. Abel becomes even more fearful and will not even allow Manuela to touch him, and she starts to suffer from extreme mood swings. Abel gets drunk at a local bar, and on his way home, he vandalizes a bakery and gets into a fight with the baker and his wife, but has no recollection of why he did so. He is found in the street by a prostitute who convinces him to have sex with her. They enter the brothel, but it is already occupied by a man who is ranting about another prostitute, with whom Abel has sex.

Abel returns home to find Manuela dead on the kitchen floor and the apartment littered with cameras. He flees the scene and soon finds himself in a mysterious, seemingly abandoned industrial building. Eventually he is discovered by an unknown attacker and the two fight in an elevator, which Abel uses to cut off the attacker's head.

Abel returns to the hospital and confronts the doctor about the inhumane experiments carried out at the hospital. The doctor claims that all of the subjects of the experiments were volunteers, whom he states "would do anything for a little money and a warm meal." Abel is then shown footage of a man injected with a serum that drove him mad within minutes; the effects of the drug subsided, but the man committed suicide a few days later. It is revealed that Abel's brother Max was an assistant who was interested by the experiments and, against the objections of the doctor, he opted to inject himself with the serum, which later triggered his own suicide. Abel is shown a video in which a man and a woman living in the same apartment that he and Manuela had inhabited are driven into a frenzy by an odorless gas that causes extreme mood swings. He also states that it was not his intention to subject them to any detrimental experiments, as the buildings connected to the apartment had already been vacated. He was sincerely trying to help them and was fond of Manuela. As the police arrive on the scene and attempt to enter the laboratory, the doctor swallows a cyanide capsule and states that Germany is in need of a revolution that ordinary people are too weak to carry out, and that these experiments will benefit mankind in the long run. He then dies.

Abel is shown recovering from his ordeal in a psychiatric ward. The chief of police tells him that the circus has offered him his old job and forces him to accept the offer to begin right away. He also mentions that the Nazi party's latest attempt to seize power has failed.

A voice-over reveals that Abel escaped from police custody on the way to the train station and was never seen again.

Cast 

 Liv Ullmann (Manuela Rosenberg)
 David Carradine (Abel Rosenberg)
 Gert Fröbe (Inspector Bauer)
 Heinz Bennent (Hans Vergérus)
 James Whitmore (Priest)
 Glynn Turman (Monroe)
 Georg Hartmann (Hollinger)
 Edith Heerdegen (Mrs Holle)
  (Miss Dorst)
 Fritz Straßner (Doctor Soltermann)
 Hans Quest (Doctor Silbermann)
 Wolfgang Weiser (Official)
 Paula Braend (Mrs. Hemse)
 Walter Schmidinger (Solomon)
 Lisi Mangold (Mikaela)
 Grischa Huber (Stella)
 Paul Bürks
 Toni Berger (Mr. Rosenberg)
 Erna Brunell (Mrs. Rosenberg)
 Isolde Barth
 Rosemarie Heinikel
 Andrea L'Arronge
 Beverly McNeely
 Hans Eichler (Max)
 Kai Fischer
 Harry Kalenberg
 Gaby Dohm
 Christian Berkel (Student)
 Paul Burian
 Charles Regnier
 Günter Meisner
 Heide Picha
 Günter Malzacher
 Hubert Mittendorf
 Hertha von Walther
 Ellen Umlauf
 Renate Grosser
 Hildegard Busse
 Richard Bohne
 Emil Feist
 Heino Hallhuber
 Irene Steinbeisser

Production
Elliott Gould claimed that Bergman had written the lead role for him, but that producer Dino De Laurentiis overruled it, with David Carradine cast in his place.

The film was released one year after Bergman had left Sweden for Germany following a tax-evasion charge.

Reception
The Serpent's Egg opened to mostly negative reviews from critics. In the Chicago Reader, Dave Kehr opined that Bergman "comes very close to camp" and argued that the suffering throughout the work "... has no shape or substance, apart from pointing out that Nazis and their progenitors were not nice people." Roger Ebert wrote that "... there is no form, no pattern, and when Bergman tries to impose one by artsy pseudo-newsreel footage and a solemn narration, he reminds us only of the times he has used both better." 
The film holds a rating of 20% on Rotten Tomatoes from 20 reviews.

References

External links 
 
 
 
 
 The Serpent's Egg, A Film PDF
 The Serpents Egg PDF

1977 films
1977 drama films
German drama films
1970s English-language films
English-language German films
English-language Swedish films
1970s German-language films
Films directed by Ingmar Bergman
Films produced by Dino De Laurentiis
Films with screenplays by Ingmar Bergman
Films set in 1923
Films set in Berlin
Holocaust films
Paramount Pictures films
Swedish drama films
West German films
1977 multilingual films
German multilingual films
1970s German films
1970s Swedish films